Robert Theodor Andersson (18 October 1886, Stockholm – 2 March 1972) was a Swedish water polo player, diver, and freestyle swimmer who competed in the 1906 Summer Olympics, in the 1908 Summer Olympics, in the 1912 Summer Olympics, and in the 1920 Summer Olympics.

He was part of the Swedish team, which was able to win three consecutive medals. He also competed in several swimming events from 1906 to 1920. In 1906, 1908 and 1912 he also participated in diving competitions.

See also
 Sweden men's Olympic water polo team records and statistics
 Dual sport and multi-sport Olympians
 List of Olympic medalists in water polo (men)
 World record progression 200 metres breaststroke

References

External links
 

1886 births
1972 deaths
Sportspeople from Stockholm
Swedish male water polo players
Swedish male divers
Swedish male freestyle swimmers
Olympic water polo players of Sweden
Olympic divers of Sweden
Olympic swimmers of Sweden
Water polo players at the 1908 Summer Olympics
Water polo players at the 1912 Summer Olympics
Water polo players at the 1920 Summer Olympics
Divers at the 1906 Intercalated Games
Divers at the 1908 Summer Olympics
Divers at the 1912 Summer Olympics
Swimmers at the 1906 Intercalated Games
Swimmers at the 1908 Summer Olympics
Swimmers at the 1912 Summer Olympics
Swimmers at the 1920 Summer Olympics
Olympic silver medalists for Sweden
Olympic bronze medalists for Sweden
World record setters in swimming
Olympic medalists in water polo
Medalists at the 1920 Summer Olympics
Medalists at the 1912 Summer Olympics
Medalists at the 1908 Summer Olympics
20th-century Swedish people